The Dangu (Dhaŋu, Dhangu) are an Aboriginal Australian people of Arnhem Land, in the Northern Territory, one of many Yolŋu peoples. They are, according to Norman Tindale, to be carefully distinguished from the Djaŋu.

Two prominent clans of the Dangu are the Rirratjingu and Galpu clans.

Country
The extent of Dangu territory could not be established by Tindale, who located them in the general area of Yirrkala Mission, Cape Arnhem, Melville Bay, and Port Bradshaw.

Social organisation
Like all Yolŋu societies, the Dangu, identified as a grouping of clans (mala) sharing similar dialects, were organised according to the Dhuwa and Yirritja (Jiritja) moieties. Their ethnonymic identity as a unified group was based on their common word for the demonstrative pronoun "this." They are divided into six clans according to which moiety they belong to, of four Dua, and six Yirritja.

The Dua moiety:
 1. Galpu (Gälpu, Galbu, Kalpu).
 2. Golumala.
 3. Ngajimil. (Ngayimil, Ngeimil, Makkanaimulmi).
 4. Riratjingu. (Rirratjingu, Rirraljinga, Riraidjango, Wurrulul, Woralul, Urorlurl).

The Yirritja moiety:
 5. Lamami. (Lamumiri).
 6. Wanguri. (Wangurri, Wonguri, Wan:guri).

Mythology
In the Gälpu clan legends, Wititj, the huge ancestral rainbow serpent was said create thunder and lightning as it moved across the land, but is also associated with the calm freshwater systems where the spirits reside, among water lilies and palm trees.

Alternative names
 Yirgala. (A toponym).

Notable people
 Djalu Gurruwiwi, highly respected elder, maker and player of the yiḏaki, of the Galpu clan, and other members of the Gurruwiwi family
 Many members of the Marika family, of the Rirratjingu clan

Notes

Citations

Sources

Further reading
Galpu (Buku Art Centre)

 The fight for land rights.

Yolngu